Agrionympha sagittella is a species of moth belonging to the family Micropterigidae. It was described by George W. Gibbs and Niels P. Kristensen in 2011. It is found in South Africa, where it is known from the Hogsback and Ngadu Forests in the Eastern Cape.

It has been recorded amongst ferns, grasses and shrubs on damp sunny banks where liverworts are visible and along sunny roadsides or tracks at altitudes between 940 and 1,300 meters.

The length of the forewings is 3.2–3.5 mm for males and 3.6–3.8 mm for females.

Etymology
The specific name is derived from sagitta (meaning arrow), referring to the arrow-shaped or T-configuration of the confluent forewing median and claval bands is unique to this species.

References

Endemic moths of South Africa
Micropterigidae
Moths described in 2011
Moths of Africa